is a Japanese football player of Korean descent who plays for Singapore-based Albirex Niigata. He has made 11 appearances for the Japanese national team. He is sometimes known as Chung, in reference to his Korean name, Lee Chung-sung.

Early life and family
Lee was born to third generation Zainichi Korean parents in Tanashi (present-day Nishitokyo), Tokyo. He has Byeokjin Lee (벽진이씨) ancestry. His father was also a footballer, who played for Yokohama Tristar FC in the Japan Soccer League.

His Korean name is Lee Chung-Sung (Korean: 이충성, Hanja: 李 忠成) and also had used pass name .

Club career

Japan
Lee started playing football at Komine FC and later moved to Yokogawa Electric. In 2001, he joined FC Tokyo youth team and took second places at All Japan Club Youth Soccer tournament, Prince Takamado Cup and J.League Youth tournament. He briefly joined training squads for the South Korea U-19 and U-20 teams but not played at official games. He experienced severe discrimination from Korean teammates referring to him as a ban-jjokbari (half-Jap) with strong racial undertones.

He was promoted to FC Tokyo in 2004 and moved to Kashiwa Reysol in 2005 and later joined Sanfrecce Hiroshima in 2009.

Southampton
On 11 January 2012, Lee secured a work permit to allow him to play for Southampton, who confirmed the free transfer on 25 January 2012.

He made his debut for Southampton on 28 January 2012, as a substitute in a fourth round FA Cup match against Millwall. Lee started and played the duration of the replay, failing to score as Millwall won 3–2 after a 92nd-minute winner from Liam Feeney.

He scored his first goal for Southampton in a 4–0 victory over Derby County on 18 February, with a "venomous strike into the far corner" of the goal.
He made his first league start one week later, a 3–0 victory away at Watford, with Lee winning a penalty for the third goal scored by Rickie Lambert. After damaging ligaments on 10 March 2012 Lee missed the rest of the season.

His goal won the Southampton's Goal of the Season Award.

After 5 months out injured, he made his return to action with a goal in a 4–1 victory at Stevenage in the League Cup.

He was handed the number 19 shirt for the 2013–14 season after Southampton invited him back to the First Team. He made his first return to the Southampton team after year when starting in the League Cup against Bristol City.

On 14 January 2014 he was released from his contract at Southampton after a two-year spell.

Return to Japan
On 14 February 2013, Lee returned to his former club, FC Tokyo on loan until the end of June. He made his debut on 2 March 2013, coming on as a 72nd-minute substitutee. He scored his first goal for the club on 23 March 2013 in the 77th minute against two-time defending champion Kashima Antlers.

Singapore
On 1 January 2022, Lee joined Singapore-based Albirex Niigata on a one-year deal. He made his debut in the 2022 Charity Shield, netting a penalty in a 2-1 loss to reigning SPL champions Lion City Sailors.

International career
In August 2008, Lee was selected Japan U-23 national team for 2008 Summer Olympics. At this tournament, he played all 3 matches.

After becoming a regular starter for Sanfrecce and finishing the 2010 season strongly, Lee was rewarded with a call-up to Japan's 2011 Asian Cup squad and made his full international debut on 9 January 2011 against Jordan. His first international goal was dramatic, coming as it did in the 109th minute of the final to secure a 1–0 win over Australia and Japan's fourth Asian Cup success.

Club statistics

National team statistics

International career statistics

Appearances in major competitions

Goals for senior national team

Honours

Club
Sanfrecce Hiroshima
J.League Cup runner-up: 2010

Southampton
EFL Championship runner-up: 2011–12

Urawa Reds
J.League Cup (1): 2016
Suruga Bank Championship (1): 2017
AFC Champions League (1): 2017
Emperor's Cup (1): 2018

Yokohama F. Marinos
J1 League (1): 2019

International
Japan
AFC Asian Cup: 2011
Kirin Cup: 2011

References

External links

 
 
 Japan National Football Team Database
 
 
 
 
 Tadanari Lee career profile

1985 births
Living people
Association football people from Tokyo Metropolis
Japanese footballers
Japan international footballers
J1 League players
J2 League players
English Football League players
FC Tokyo players
Kashiwa Reysol players
Sanfrecce Hiroshima players
Southampton F.C. players
Urawa Red Diamonds players
Yokohama F. Marinos players
Kyoto Sanga FC players
Olympic footballers of Japan
Footballers at the 2008 Summer Olympics
2011 AFC Asian Cup players
AFC Asian Cup-winning players
Japanese expatriate footballers
Japanese people of Korean descent
Naturalized citizens of Japan
Zainichi Korean people
Association football forwards
People from Nishitōkyō, Tokyo
Albirex Niigata Singapore FC players
Japanese expatriate sportspeople in Singapore
Expatriate footballers in Singapore